Christian Mate Pulisic (born September 18, 1998) is an American professional soccer player who plays as a winger or attacking midfielder for  club Chelsea and the United States national team. Nicknamed "Captain America" by fans and other players, Pulisic is renowned for his dribbling abilities and explosive speed.

Pulisic began his professional career at German club Borussia Dortmund, where he progressed quickly through the team's youth academy, featuring in only 15 youth games. He was then promoted to the senior team in 2016, at age 17. He featured sparingly in his first season at the club, but his involvement increased dramatically in the following campaign, where he was a mainstay in the Dortmund team that won the 2016–17 DFB-Pokal. In 2018, he finished second in the inaugural Kopa Trophy, given to the best player under age 21.

In January 2019, Pulisic moved to Chelsea in a transfer worth $73 million (£57.6 million), making him the most expensive North American player of all time, and began playing for the club in the 2019–20 season. At 21 years old he became the youngest Chelsea player to score a hat-trick. With Chelsea he won the 2020–21 UEFA Champions League, 2021 UEFA Super Cup and 2021 FIFA Club World Cup, becoming the youngest Chelsea player and first American to score in the Champions League semi-finals and the first American to play in the Champions League final.

Pulisic played for the United States at under-15 and under-17 levels, before making his senior national team debut in March 2016 at age 17. He is the youngest player ever to captain the United States national team in the modern era. He helped the U.S. to the final of the 2019 CONCACAF Gold Cup and won the inaugural 2019–20 CONCACAF Nations League. Individually, he has won a U.S. Soccer Young Male Athlete of the Year award and three U.S. Soccer Male Athlete of the Year awards.

Early life
Pulisic was born in Hershey, Pennsylvania, where he spent the majority of his childhood. His parents, Kelley and Mark Pulisic, both played collegiate soccer at George Mason University and his father also played professional indoor soccer for the Harrisburg Heat in the 1990s and later became a coach at both youth and professional levels. Growing up, his soccer idol was Luís Figo.

While his mother was on a teacher exchange in England through the Fulbright Program, Pulisic lived for a year in Tackley, Oxfordshire. At age seven, he began playing for the youth team of Brackley Town. When his father was general manager of indoor club Detroit Ignition in the mid-2000s, Pulisic lived in Michigan and played for Michigan Rush. While in Michigan, he attended Workman Elementary School.

Club career
After the family returned to the Hershey area, Pulisic grew up playing for local U.S. Soccer Development Academy club PA Classics and occasionally training with local professional club Harrisburg City Islanders, now known as Penn FC, during his teen years. In the summer of 2010, he went on a five-day trial at Chelsea's Cobham base.

U17 
On Dec. 13, 2013, he played opposite Brazil at a U17 tournament in Florida. He scored a goal in a 4-1 win. He has stated that this day was a significant milestone for him and the date "12/13/2013" is now tattooed on his arm.

Borussia Dortmund
Pulisic moved to Germany before his 16th birthday. He became eligible on the premise that his grandfather was Croatian, therefore he could get a European passport and play starting at age 16 rather than 18. He initially had issues getting the passport, but it eventually panned out.

In February 2015, Borussia Dortmund signed 16-year-old Pulisic and assigned him first to their U17 squad and in summer 2015 to the U19. After scoring 10 goals and assisting eight in just 15 games with the Dortmund youth teams, Pulisic was called to join the first team over winter break.

2015–16: Breakthrough season
In January 2016, while with the first team in the winter break, Pulisic played the second half of two friendly matches, scoring one goal and assisting another. On January 24, a day after making his debut on the first team bench, Pulisic played 90 minutes in a friendly against Union Berlin, scoring a goal and assisting another. He made his Bundesliga debut in a 2–0 win against Ingolstadt on January 30, 2016, coming on as a second-half substitute for Adrián Ramos. On February 18, Pulisic made his UEFA Europa League debut as a second-half substitute in a 2–0 victory against Porto.

Pulisic made his first Bundesliga start on February 21, against Bayer Leverkusen, before eventually being substituted for Marco Reus. He made his second Bundesliga start on April 10, against Schalke 04 in the Revierderby, playing 73 minutes before being replaced by İlkay Gündoğan. In response to Pulisic's performance against Schalke, team manager Thomas Tuchel said, "He's a teenager in his first year of professional football. His first two games in the starting eleven were in Leverkusen and here today in Schalke – not the easiest of tasks. It shows our huge appreciation that we see him as a full time player on our team. He was a valuable substitute against Werder Bremen and Liverpool. He has looked really good recently which has been proved today. It is completely normal that he could not have played with this pace and this intensity for over 90 minutes."

Pulisic scored his first Bundesliga goal for Borussia Dortmund on April 17, opening the scoring in a 3–0 home win against Hamburg. It made him the youngest non-German and fourth-youngest player to score a goal in the Bundesliga, at 17 years and 212 days old. With his goal against VfB Stuttgart on April 23, Pulisic broke another Bundesliga scoring record by becoming the youngest player to score two goals in the top-flight league. The game also marked his first yellow card in the Bundesliga, as a result of a challenge on Emiliano Insúa.

2016–19: DFB-Pokal win and departure
In the 2016 International Champions Cup friendly pre-season tournament, Pulisic scored in stoppage time against Manchester City to send the clubs into penalties. During his first competitive appearance in his second year with the club, Pulisic became Dortmund's youngest player ever to play in the UEFA Champions League. The following weekend he scored his first goal of the season and provided two assists in a 6–0 victory against Darmstadt 98, one day before his 18th birthday.

In a September Champions League group stage game against Real Madrid, with Dortmund trailing 2–1, Pulisic came on as a second-half substitute and helped set up André Schürrle's late goal, allowing Dortmund to earn a 2–2 draw. In a substitute appearance on October 22, Pulisic assisted one goal and scored the equalizer against Ingolstadt 04, who were last place at the beginning of the day, to salvage a draw, coming back from 3–1 down.

On January 23, 2017, Pulisic signed a new deal with Dortmund which would keep him at the club until 2020. On March 8, 2017, Pulisic scored his first UEFA Champions League goal in a 4–0 victory over Benfica in the round of 16, making him Dortmund's youngest ever scorer in the competition at the age of 18 years, 5 months, and 18 days. Pulisic also assisted one of Pierre-Emerick Aubameyang's goals in the win, advancing Dortmund to the quarter-finals. On August 5, 2017, Pulisic scored the first goal in the DFL-Supercup against Bayern Munich.

Chelsea
On January 2, 2019, Pulisic signed with Premier League club Chelsea for an estimated £58 million transfer fee. The deal also saw him stay at Dortmund on loan for the remainder of the 2018–19 season. This transfer made Pulisic the most expensive American player and Borussia Dortmund's second most expensive sale of all time, behind Ousmane Dembélé. Upon his arrival in the summer, he spoke of his desire to replicate the form shown by Eden Hazard and described the forward as a soccer idol.

2019–20: Debut season, injury and Premier League breakthrough
On August 11, 2019, Pulisic made his Premier League debut for Chelsea in a 0–4 defeat against Manchester United. Pulisic scored his first goals for Chelsea on October 26, 2019, completing a "perfect" hat-trick in a 4–2 away win against Burnley. The hat-trick was the first of his career, and he became the second American to achieve the feat in the Premier League after Clint Dempsey for Fulham in 2012, as well as the youngest hat-trick scorer in Chelsea's history at the age of 21 years and 38 days. He also became the first Chelsea player to score a perfect hat trick since Didier Drogba in 2010. Pulisic scored in his next two league outings, a 2–1 away victory against Watford and a 2–0 home win over Crystal Palace.

On October 23, 2019, during Champions League 2019–20 matched against Ajax, Pulisic played as a substitute and assisted Michy Batshuayi's late goal 1–0 win. The Belgium striker thumped home fellow substitute Pulisic's low cross with just four minutes remaining at Johan Cruyff Arena to earn the Blues back to back away wins in the competition. He scored his first Champions League goal for Chelsea in a 2–2 draw away to Valencia on November 27.

When the Premier League fixtures resumed after the lockdown due to the COVID-19 pandemic, Pulisic had recovered from injury and came off the bench to score the equalizer in Chelsea's 2–1 win against Aston Villa on June 21, 2020. In the following match, Pulisic scored the first goal in Chelsea's 2–1 victory over Manchester City, a result that eliminated the second-placed City from title contention and confirmed Liverpool as Premier League champions. On July 22, Pulisic scored a goal in a 3–5 defeat to Liverpool.

On August 1, he scored the opening goal in the 2020 FA Cup Final against Arsenal after five minutes, becoming the first American player to score in the final of the competition, but was substituted early in the second half after sustaining a hamstring injury. Arsenal eventually came from behind to win the match 2–1.

In August 2020, Pulisic was named to the eight-player shortlist for the inaugural Premier League Young Player of the Season award, which was eventually awarded to Liverpool's Trent Alexander-Arnold.

Pulisic ended the season with 11 goals and 10 assists in all competitions.

2020–21: Comeback from injury and Champions League win

Ahead of his second season at Chelsea, Pulisic was given the number 10 shirt after Willian, who wore the number the previous season, departed in the offseason to Arsenal. He returned to training on September 9 following the hamstring injury he suffered in the FA Cup Final in August, although Lampard kept him off the squad for the season opener against Brighton after experiencing some discomfort later in the week.

Pulisic made his season debut on October 3, coming off the bench late in a 4–0 win over Crystal Palace. He made his first Premier League start of the season on October 17, a 3–3 draw against Southampton. On October 28, Pulisic came off the bench to score a 90th-minute goal in a 4–0 Champions League away win against Krasnodar. With his 93rd-minute goal for Chelsea against rivals Leeds United on December 5, Pulisic became the fastest American to reach 10 goals in the Premier League.

On April 3, 2021, Pulisic scored the opening goal in a 2–5 home league defeat to West Bromwich Albion. A week later, Pulisic scored a double against Crystal Palace in a 4–1 victory at Selhurst Park. On April 27, Pulisic scored Chelsea's only goal in a 1–1 away draw against Real Madrid at the Estadio Alfredo Di Stéfano in the first leg of the Champions League semi-final tie, becoming the youngest Chelsea player and first American to score in the Champions League semi-finals. In the return game at Stamford Bridge, Pulisic came on as a substitute and provided the assist for Mason Mount's late goal to make it 2–0 and secure passage to the final. On May 29, Pulisic won his first Champions League after Chelsea won 1–0 against Manchester City in the final at the Estádio do Dragão in Porto, becoming the first American to play in a UEFA Champions League Final and the second American to win it after Jovan Kirovski in 1997 with Borussia Dortmund.

2021–22: Club World Cup win
Pulisic scored in Chelsea's opening game of the 2021–22 Premier League season, a 3–0 win over Crystal Palace. He tested positive for COVID-19 the next week, and didn't play again until November because of an ankle injury.

On January 2, 2022, he scored the equalizer in a 2–2 draw at home against Liverpool. He then came on early as a substitute in the 2021 FIFA Club World Cup Final, helping Chelsea to a 2–1 over Palmeiras. He started the EFL Cup Final against Liverpool on February 27 as Chelsea lost on penalties after a 0–0 draw. He scored in both legs of the club's UEFA Champions League last 16 tie against Lille, as Chelsea progressed 4–1 on aggregate.

2022–23 
Pulisic scored in his first start under new Chelsea manager Graham Potter, a 3–0 win over Wolverhampton Wanderers.

International career
Pulisic represented the United States at U-15 and U-17 levels. He scored two goals in 10 appearances for the under-15 team. He captained the U-17 team at the 2015 FIFA U-17 World Cup, where he scored a goal and an assist in three games. During his two years with the team, Pulisic scored a total of 20 goals in 34 games. Pulisic had been eligible to play internationally for Croatia but declined the opportunity.

On March 27, 2016, Pulisic was called up to the senior team by head coach Jürgen Klinsmann ahead of a World Cup qualifying game against Guatemala. Two days later, he made his debut in that match, a 4–0 win at the Mapfre Stadium in Columbus, Ohio, as an 81st-minute substitute for Graham Zusi. He thus became the youngest American to play in a World Cup qualifier.

Pulisic was included in the senior squad for the Copa América Centenario, which was hosted by the United States. A week later, he became the youngest player to score for the United States in the modern era, when he put home a late goal in a 4–0 friendly win against visiting side Bolivia.

On September 2, 2016, Pulisic recorded two goals and an assist in a World Cup qualifying match in a 6–0 victory over Saint Vincent and the Grenadines, thereby becoming the youngest person to score in a World Cup qualifier for the United States and the youngest player to score a brace in American history. In the following match against Trinidad and Tobago, he broke another youth record by becoming the youngest American to start a World Cup qualifying match. In the following year of qualification, on June 8, Pulisic scored both goals in a 2–0 victory over Trinidad and Tobago. In the last two matches of qualification, Pulisic scored a goal in each: a 4–0 victory over Panama and a 1–2 defeat to Trinidad and Tobago. He finished the fifth round as the top scorer with five goals. Despite his strong performances, the United States failed to qualify for the 2018 FIFA World Cup. The loss to Trinidad and Tobago is considered the most humiliating performance in American soccer history.

On November 20, 2018, Pulisic became the youngest player to captain the United States national team in a friendly defeat to Italy. Pulisic was 20 years and 63 days old.

On March 26, 2019, Christian Pulisic became the youngest United States player to score 10 international goals at 20 years, 189 days old. 

On June 6, 2021, Pulisic captained the United States national team to a 3–2 victory in the first-ever CONCACAF Nations League final against Mexico, scoring the winning goal by converting a penalty in the 114th minute.

On March 27, 2022, Pulisic scored his first international hat-trick for the U.S. men's national team during their win over Panama in the 2022 FIFA World Cup qualification. His first two goals from the hat trick came from penalty kicks.

At the 2022 FIFA World Cup, Pulisic assisted Tim Weah for the team's opening group stage goal against Wales. He received his first FIFA World Cup Man of the Match award for his offensive pressure during the 0-0 draw against England. In the following game Pulisic earned his second Man of the Match award after scoring the winner in the United States' 1–0 win over Iran in their last group stage game, sending his team to the knockouts. In the Round of 16, he assisted Haji Wright's goal against the Netherlands as the United States was defeated 3–1.

Style of play
Following his promotion to the Dortmund first team, FourFourTwo writer Andy Mitten wrote that the Dortmund manager Thomas Tuchel "saw the potential – the speed, sharpness, strength, sublime fitness and mature decision-making that belied his age." Tuchel called Pulisic "the kind of guy who's very self-confident, shows his talent on the pitch, and doesn't show any nerves under pressure – which is a wonderful combination." Pulisic's Dortmund teammate Nuri Şahin said, "He's fearless [...] He has so much speed, but what I like most is his first touch. When he gets the ball, his first touch opens up a huge space for him even if there's no space." Since the 2018–19 season, Pulisic was most often deployed on the wing for Dortmund, and this has continued at Chelsea. Because of his style of play, Pulisic is often subjected to fouls by opponents.

In July 2020, Chelsea manager Frank Lampard compared him positively to former Chelsea winger Eden Hazard, saying Pulisic "has a more direct attacking instinct. He has the talent to pass through defenders and run inside the box which is a great trait in the modern game." Lampard added, "There's still more development to come. Christian is taking responsibility to change games."

Personal life
Both the anglicized pronunciation and the original Croatian pronunciation have been used by commentators, and Pulisic confirmed that either form is acceptable. 

Pulisic's paternal grandfather, Mate Pulišić, was born in Croatia on the island of Olib. Pulisic obtained Croatian citizenship after moving to Germany in order to avoid applying for a German work visa, which is required to work in the country without a European Union passport. Pulisic has a cousin, Will Pulisic, who plays for USL League One club North Carolina FC on loan from Austin FC.

Pulisic is Catholic. He often posts Bible verses on his social media accounts.

Outside of soccer, Pulisic is a fan of the New York Jets, New York Rangers, and Philadelphia 76ers. He enjoys playing chess. Pulisic is a fan of the Ford Mustang and imported a left-hand drive Shelby GT500 to England from the United States in 2021.

Due to his status of frequently captaining the United States and his high level of play, he has been given the nickname "Captain America" by fans and other players. He has also been nicknamed "The LeBron James of Soccer" due to a clip from the television show Pawn Stars, which has since become a meme.

On October 11, 2022, he released an autobiography titled Pulisic: My Journey So Far. The book chronicles his journey into the soccer world. In the book, he also revealed that he suffered with depression while he was injured in 2020 and during times that he did not get much playing time.

Career statistics

Club

International

Honors
Borussia Dortmund
DFB-Pokal: 2016–17; runner-up: 2015–16

Chelsea
UEFA Champions League: 2020–21
UEFA Super Cup: 2021
FIFA Club World Cup: 2021
FA Cup runner-up: 2019–20, 2020–21, 2021–22
EFL Cup runner-up: 2021–22

United States U17
CONCACAF Under-17 Championship third place: 2015

United States
CONCACAF Nations League: 2019–20
CONCACAF Gold Cup runner-up: 2019

Individual
U.S. Soccer Young Male Athlete of the Year: 2016
UEFA Champions League Breakthrough XI: 2016
U.S. Soccer Male Athlete of the Year: 2017, 2019, 2021
CONCACAF Best XI: 2017
CONCACAF Gold Cup Best Young Player Award: 2019
CONCACAF Gold Cup Best XI: 2019
CONCACAF Nations League Finals Best XI: 2021

Bibliography 

 2022, C. Pulisic, D. Melamud, A. White, Pulisic: My Journey So Far, Published by Rizzoli. .

References

External links

 Profile at the Chelsea F.C. website
 
 
 
 
 
 

1998 births
Living people
People from Hershey, Pennsylvania
Soccer players from Pennsylvania
American soccer players
Association football wingers
Brackley Town F.C. players
Borussia Dortmund players
Chelsea F.C. players
Bundesliga players
Premier League players
FA Cup Final players
UEFA Champions League winning players
United States men's youth international soccer players
United States men's international soccer players
Copa América Centenario players
2019 CONCACAF Gold Cup players
2022 FIFA World Cup players
American expatriate soccer players
Expatriate footballers in England
American expatriate sportspeople in England
American expatriate soccer players in Germany
American people of Croatian descent
Citizens of Croatia through descent